Pony car is an American car classification for affordable, compact, highly styled coupés or convertibles with a "sporty" or performance-oriented image. Common characteristics include rear-wheel drive, a long hood, a short decklid, a wide range of options to individualize each car and use of mass-produced parts shared with other models.

There is much debate among enthusiasts about the exact definition of a pony car, and what differentiates it from a muscle car. The general consensus is that pony cars are smaller and more refined than muscle cars. A few intermediate-size vehicles, such as the Dodge Challenger, may be considered to belong to both categories.

The popularity of pony cars is largely due to the launch of the Ford Mustang in 1964.

Currently produced pony cars include the Ford Mustang, Chevrolet Camaro, and Dodge Challenger.

History

1960–1963: Predecessors 

In the early 1960s, Ford, Plymouth, and AMC began noticing the rising interest in small, sporty cars, and the increasing importance of younger customers. In order to convince the management of Ford to approve a small, sporty car for production, the Budd Company built a prototype two-seat roadster called the XT-Bird. The XT-Bird was built using the compact car chassis of the Ford Falcon with a modified 1957 Ford Thunderbird body. Ford rejected the proposal, preferring to design a four-seat sporty car instead which would expand its sales volume.

The Budd Company then approached American Motors Corporation (AMC) with the Budd XR-400 prototype, which was based on a 1962 AMC Ambassador two-door with a shortened chassis and the body moved  rearward to allow for a longer hood (bonnet). The automaker's "management expressed interest in a new car with a sports flair" and work on the AMC Rambler Tarpon, a 2+2 coupe with an elongated fastback roof, began in early 1963.

Examples of production cars that included sporty and youthful appeal were the 1960 Chevrolet Corvair. Initially positioned as an economy car, the Corvair's plusher-trimmed and sportier Monza model sold around 144,000 units by 1961. The Corvair Monza's bucket seats and floor-mounted transmission shifter started a trend toward these features being offered in cars ranging from compacts to full-size cars. Competing models inspired by the Corvair Monza included the Ford Falcon Futura and Futura Sprint models and the Rambler American 440-H and Rogue models. Most sporty compacts were powered by the same economical six-cylinder engines as their more mundane platform counterparts, but in some cases, optional V8 engines were available along with four-speed manual transmissions.

1964–1966: Initial pony cars released 

The first pony car to be released was the Plymouth Barracuda, which went on sale on April 1, 1964, (two weeks before the Ford Mustang). The Barracuda was released as a fastback coupe, based on the platform of the Plymouth Valiant compact car. Chrysler's precarious financial situation meant that there was a limited development budget for the Barracuda, which led to a compromised design. The Barracuda was criticized for having insufficient distinction from the Valiant and the styling drew mixed reactions. As a result, Barracuda sales were a fraction of the Mustang's.

At the Ford Motor Company, executive Lee Iacocca had commissioned marketing studies that suggested that if a unique-looking sporty car could be offered at an affordable price, it would find many buyers. Therefore Ford continued development of a sporty 2+2 car based on the Ford Falcon platform, leading to the launch of the 1965 Ford Mustang on April 17, 1964. The Mustang was available as a two-door coupé and convertible, and had a unique "long hood, short deck" appearance. In its base specification, the drivetrain was typical of an economy car: a  six-cylinder engine and three-speed manual transmission. Its attractive  base price included bucket seats, carpeting, floor shifter, sport steering wheel, and full-wheel covers. However, options such as V8 engines, a four-speed manual gearbox, air conditioning and power steering could increase the price by up to 60%, which made such versions very profitable for Ford.

The Mustang was an enormous success, with first-year sales forecasts of 100,000 units being shattered on the first day, when Ford dealers took orders for 22,000 vehicles, forcing the company to shift production mid-year. The extended model year sales totaled 618,812 Mustangs. The Mustang broke all post-World War II automobile sales records, "creating the 'pony car' craze soon adopted by competitors."

The 1965 Mustang provided the template for the new class of automobiles. The term "pony car" to describe members of its ranks was coined by Car Life magazine editor Dennis Shattuck. The characteristics of a pony car were defined as:
 A sporty compact car for the masses, that could carry four people
 Long hood, short deck profile, and "open mouth" styling
 Affordable base price (under  – in 1965 dollar value)
 Wide range of options to individualize each car
 Manufactured using mass-produced parts shared with other models
 Youth-oriented marketing and advertising

Many pony cars were produced with economical six-cylinder or small V8 engines and although powerful engines and performance packages were offered, the majority were sold with six-cylinder engines or relatively small V8 engines. The high-performance models saw limited sales and were largely limited to drag racing, road racing or motorsport homologation purposes.

1967–1970 Segment expands 

Initially, General Motors believed that the restyled 1965 Chevrolet Corvair (a rear-engined compact car) would be an adequate challenger for the Mustang. However, when it became clear that the Corvair itself was doomed, the more conventional Nova-based Chevrolet Camaro was introduced for the 1967 model year built on the new GM F-body platform and used a conventional front-engine layout. A few months later, the Camaro-based Pontiac Firebird was introduced.

The Mustang was redesigned for the 1967 model year and became the basis for the upscale Mercury Cougar on a longer wheelbase.

American Motors introduced its first pony car in 1967 with the AMC Javelin. It was described as a "roomy, comfortable, peppy and handsome example of a so-called pony car, the type of automobile that's showing up more and more on US highways."

In 1969, the Dodge Challenger joined the already crowded pony car segment. The Challenger was essentially an enlarged Barracuda.

The pony car market segment was maturing and all four domestic automakers were building versions of the long hood/short deck template that Ford had developed. The term pony car applied to all versions of these nameplates, from base models to the high-performance muscle car models, developed in league with factory supported racing to gain a marketing edge. The competition between the manufacturers was so fierce that the introduction and rollout of the Trans-Am Series from 1966 to 1972 is described as a battle in "The Pony Car Wars".

While sales were strong throughout the end of the 1960s, pony cars' greater value was in generating brand loyalty, particularly among the crucial youth market. In 1970 Car and Driver reported that while very few pony car drivers bought a second, around 50% purchased another model from the same manufacturer. Even so, by as early as 1969 sales were beginning to slide, dropping to 9% of the total market from a peak of 13% in 1967.

Directly inspired by the Ford Mustang, Ford of Europe began production of the Ford Capri in 1968, (using the Cortina MkII platform and driveline and a few components from the Escort) while GM of Europe introduced the Opel Manta and Vauxhall Firenza. In April 1970, the Capri began to be imported from Europe and was sold in Lincoln-Mercury dealerships.

The success of the Mustang also inspired the creation of the Toyota Celica compact coupe, which was released in 1970, while Toyota had earlier introduced the 1967 Toyota 1600GT 2-door hardtop and installed a DOHC I4 cylinder engine with dual carburetors and a 5-speed manual transmission. Like the Mustang, the Celica was built using the platform of an economy car; although the Celica was  shorter than the Mustang and did not offer a V8 engine. Several Japanese automakers sold compact coupes in the United States as smaller competitors to pony cars. However, no Japanese manufacturer produced a pony car.

1971–1975: Larger cars, declining sales

As with many automobile redesigns, each subsequent generation of the pony cars grew larger, heavier, costlier, and more comfort-oriented. This trend towards larger and more comfort-oriented pony cars was also influenced by many buyers in the late 1960s and early 1970s purchasing optional equipment and models with higher prices. Examples of the increasing size and weight of pony cars are:
 The 1970 Dodge Challenger was only slightly smaller externally than its Dodge Coronet stablemate, an intermediate-sized four-door sedan. The Challenger was less than  lighter than a typical intermediate sedan.
 The 1973 Ford Mustang was  longer,  wider, and over  heavier than the original 1965 Mustang.

Big block V8 engines became available in pony cars, which increased straight-line performance but underscored the limitations of the suspension, brakes, and tires. The six-cylinder and lower-specification V8 engines struggled with the increased mass of the pony cars.

By 1970 buyers were moving away from the pony cars, either toward smaller compact cars or the more luxurious personal luxury cars. The pony car market was also hindered by high insurance rates and increased restrictions on performance cars. In the following years, power outputs of the performance models began to erode as a result of stricter vehicle emissions controls. By 1972, small imported sports cars were increasing in popularity, and the domestic pony cars were not selling well. Industry observers believed that the Chevrolet Camaro and Pontiac Firebird might be discontinued after the 1973 model year.

The 1973 oil crisis left the large and heavy pony cars out of step with the marketplace. The Mustang, which had grown to become an intermediate-sized car and alienated buyers, was downsized for its second-generation; this 1974 Ford Mustang II was marketed as a fuel-efficient subcompact with luxury or sporty trim packages. Inspired by smaller imported sporty cars such as the Toyota Celica and Ford Capri, the new Mustang II was unveiled a few months prior to the 1973 oil embargo. To compete with these sporty subcompacts, General Motors introduced the 1975 Chevrolet Monza and its badge-engineered variants. GM's pony cars (the Chevrolet Camaro and Pontiac Firebird) were almost canceled, but remained in production.

Chrysler Corporation did not downsize its pony car models, it discontinued the Dodge Challenger and Plymouth Barracuda after the 1974 model year. The AMC Javelin was also canceled after 1974. The 1974 Mercury Cougar—originally designed as an upscale version of the Ford Mustang—left the pony car segment, as it was upsized and marketed in the personal luxury car segment.

1976–2004: Resurgence of popularity and performance

The popularity of pony cars increased in the late 1970s with examples appearing in movies and TV programs like the Pontiac Firebird Trans Am in Smokey and the Bandit, the Pontiac Firebird in The Rockford Files and the Ford Mustang II Cobra II in Charlie's Angels. The "Z28" high-performance option for the Chevrolet Camaro had been discontinued after 1974, however it was resurrected for 1977 due to the popularity of the Pontiac Firebird Trans Am.

The 1979 Ford Mustang (third generation) was redesigned using the larger Ford Fox platform, and marketed with a renewed sporty image. The redesigned Mustang also formed the basis of the Mercury Capri (second generation), which replaced the European built first-generation and was now available with a V8 engine.

Chrysler Corporation, beset by financial problems, did not revive the pony car, instead offering smaller coupes such as the Dodge Daytona and Chrysler Conquest (a badge-engineered Mitsubishi Starion) as their sporting models.

American Motors Corporation remained absent from the pony car segment, however the 1979 AMC Spirit subcompact was marketed as a competitor to the hatchback versions of the Ford Mustang. The Spirit was available with four-cylinder, six-cylinder and V8 engines, and the model range included sporty "GT" and "AMX" models. In 1982, the Spirit GT became America's first pony car with a 5-speed manual.

In the early 1980s, concerns about fuel economy prompted Ford to seriously consider replacing the Mustang with a smaller front-wheel drive model (which eventually appeared as the Ford Probe instead). The Chevrolet Camaro and Pontiac Firebird escaped a similar fate with General Motors' front-wheel drive "GM-80" program canceled late in development. Emissions and fuel economy concerns also led the 1982 Chevrolet Camaro and Pontiac Firebird to be available with four-cylinder engines for the first time.

The introduction of fuel-injection on V8 engines in the mid-1980s—such as the Ford "5.0" engine (available in the 1986 Ford Mustang) and the General Motors "LB9" engine (introduced in the 1985 Chevrolet Camaro IROC-Z and Pontiac Firebird Trans Am)—benefitted the pony cars with increased power and fuel economy. However, declining sales and the growing popularity of light trucks and sport utility vehicles ultimately led to the Firebird and Camaro being discontinued after 2002, leaving the Mustang as the only remaining American-built pony car until the 2008 Dodge Challenger was introduced.

2005–present: Retro-style revival

Since the 1980s, the dilemma facing car manufacturers in offering pony cars is the lack of mass-produced automobile platforms to use as a basis for building them. Unlike the mid-1960s, the majority of modern compact cars are front-wheel drive with four- or six-cylinder engines, and engineering a dedicated rear-wheel drive performance vehicle platform specifically for a pony car is an expensive proposition.

The 2005 Ford Mustang (fifth generation) was the sole remaining pony car at the time of its introduction. The success of the Mustang inspired the 2008 Dodge Challenger (third-generation) to be introduced, followed by the 2010 Chevrolet Camaro (fifth generation). Unlike previous pony cars, the Challenger and fifth-gen Camaro were built on the platforms from full-size cars. The Mustang and Camaro were sold in coupe and convertible body styles, whereas the Challenger was sold only as a coupe.

The next generation of pony cars consisted of the 2015 Ford Mustang (sixth generation) and the 2016 Chevrolet Camaro (sixth generation) in 2015. The Mustang was the first pony car with independent rear suspension, a turbocharged four-cylinder engine, and right-hand drive required for specific export markets. The sixth-generation Camaro was downsized from a full-sized platform to a mid-sized platform more in line with its traditional size.

The first all-wheel drive pony car was the V6-powered 2017 Dodge Challenger GT.

The seventh-generation Mustang will debut in 2024. It is very similar to the sixth generation in size, configuration, and options.

The current Dodge Challenger and Charger are expected to be discontinued after the 2023 model year, and replaced with a new, fully electric, retro-styled Charger, which will most likely be a 2-door coupe similar to the current Challenger. Ford plans to debut the fully electric eighth-generation Mustang in 2028, and GM is considering an electric Camaro coupe as well.

Vehicles 

 AMC Javelin (1968–1974)
 Chevrolet Camaro (1967–2002; 2010–present)
 Dodge Challenger (1970–1974; 2008–present)
 Ford Mustang (1964–present)
 Mercury Capri (1979–1986)
 Mercury Cougar (1967–1973)
 Plymouth Barracuda (1964–1974)
 Pontiac Firebird (1967–2002)

Motor racing 
The 2000s pony car revival also saw a renewed focus on motor racing, beginning with the NASCAR Xfinity Series (then called the "Nationwide Series") in 2010, where the Dodge Challenger and Ford Mustang silhouette racing cars were introduced. Modern pony cars have also competed in the Rolex Sports Car Series, SCCA World Challenge, and the Michelin Pilot Challenge. The Ford Mustang and Chevrolet Camaro have been homologated for Group GT3 racing, and the Ford Mustang was homologated in 2017 for GT4 European Series. Pony cars like the Dodge Challenger, Ford Mustang, and Chevrolet Camaro are still used today in the NASCAR Pinty's Series

See also 
 Coupé
 Muscle car
 Sports compact

References

External links 
 

Car classifications
Sports cars